San Makhet is a tambon (subdistrict) of Phan District, in Chiang Rai Province, Thailand. In 2018 it had a total population of 10,206 people.

History
The subdistrict was created effective August 1, 1970 by splitting off 10 administrative villages from Mae O.

Administration

Central administration
The tambon is subdivided into 21 administrative villages (muban).

Local administration
The whole area of the subdistrict is covered by the subdistrict municipality (Thesaban Tambon) San Makhet (เทศบาลตำบลสันมะเค็ด).

References

External links
Thaitambon.com on San Makhet

Tambon of Chiang Rai province
Populated places in Chiang Rai province